Pultenaea tuberculata, commonly known as the wreath bush-pea, is a flowering plant in the family Fabaceae. It has yellow and red pea flowers and is endemic to Australia.

Description

Taxonomy and naming
Pultenaea tuberculata was first formally described in 1805 by Christiaan Hendrik Persoon and the description was published in Synopsis plantarum, seu enchiridium botanicum, complectens enumerationem systematicam specierum. The specific epithet (tuberculata) means "tuberculate" or "covered with small warty lumps".

Distribution and habitat
Wreath bush-pea grows in relatively high rainfall areas, on dry sclerophyll forest, scrub and heathland on sandstone from Lake Macquarie in the north to Bermagui in the south.

References

tuberculata
Fabales of Australia
Flora of New South Wales
Plants described in 1805